WQOR is a classic hits radio station broadcasting from Olyphant, Pennsylvania, serving the Scranton/Wilkes-Barre area. WQOR is located at 750 on the AM dial and covers much of northeastern Pennsylvania, including Scranton and Wilkes-Barre.  Referred to as "Gem 99 and 100", WQOR is owned by J.M.J. Radio Inc.; it is programmed by Geos Communications, owner of WGMM in Tunkhannock, WGMF in Nanticoke, and WGMF-FM in Dushore. WQOR broadcasts at 1.6 kilowatts during the daytime.

The station's call letters, a remnant of its previous Catholic radio programming, are an acronym for Queen of the Rosary, to whom this station is dedicated. The station began broadcasting Catholic programming on June 17, 2003, under the previous owner Holy Family Communications.

Because it shares the same frequency as "clear channel" station WSB in Atlanta, Georgia, WQOR broadcasts only during the daytime hours.

History
WQOR began its broadcast history as WRGE in 1984.

In 1987, after three years as WRGE, WWAX began its six-year run.  James Emmel a former voice at WGBI took the reins of WWAX "Live 75".  Broadcasting a bizarre combination of favorites, WWAX had its home on Lackawanna Ave. in Olyphant, PA.

In 1993, Carmen Nordone (C.V. Nordone Broadcasting) purchased 750 and WMXH took over with the slogan "Our Music Is All Mixed Up".  WMXH proudly operated under a nearly unidentifiable format which included Broadway musicals, classic country, big band music, polka, 1950s and 1960s sock hop, and religious favorites.

Five years later in 1998, WMXH was purchased by Kevin Fennessy's Fennessy Broadcasting Stations Corporation to become WAAT, initially a leased-time and ethnic station. In 2001 Fennessy would change format with the addition of Dr. Laura Schlessinger and Sinatra in the mornings.  Earlier in his career, Fennessy had worked at WAAT (1300 AM) in Trenton, New Jersey.

WQOR was inaugurated on June 17, 2003.  The third station acquired by Buffalo-based Holy Family Communications, WQOR joined The Station of the Cross. Named for "The Queen of the Rosary", WQOR began broadcasting Catholic programming provided primarily by EWTN.  On April 1, 2008, Holy Family Communications sold WQOR to J.M.J. Radio, a Scranton/Wilkes-Barre, PA based non-profit broadcaster.

On December 1, 2010, the Federal Communications Commission issued a Notice of Apparent Liability against J.M.J. Radio, Inc., in the amount of $10,000 for failing to maintain a management and staff presence at the site of WQOR's main studio.

On February 12, 2023, WQOR changed their format from Catholic religious to classic hits, branded as "Gem 99 & 100", simulcasting WGMM. The "JMJ" Catholic programming moved to FM translator W283BE (104.5), which had previously been part of the "Gem" network, and the HD4 channel of WEZX.

References

External links

QOR
Radio stations established in 1984
1984 establishments in Pennsylvania
QOR
Classic hits radio stations in the United States